Kanda Shashti Kavacham or Skanda Sashti Kavasam is a Hindu devotional song composed in Tamil by Devaraya Swamigal (born c. 1820), a student of Meenakshi Sundaram Pillai, on Lord Muruga, the son of Lord Shiva, in Chennimalai near Erode. Tamil contains many ancient hymns in praise of deities. Kanda Sashti Kavasam was composed in the 19th century.

History
The hymn was composed in the 19th century by Balan Dhevaraya Swami. The place where Balan Dhevaraya Swami staged the hymn is the Chennimalai Subramania Swamy Temple near Erode in Tamil Nadu. The lines 'Chiragiri Velavan' in the hymn refers to the Lord of Chennimalai.

Plan of the song
The song consists of a total of 244 lines, including four introductory lines known as "Kaappu," followed by a couple of meditational lines and the main song portion consisting of 238 lines known as the "Kavacham." The grammar employed in the introductory part is the Naerisai venba and that of the meditational part is the Kural venba, widely known to the Western world for its exclusive usage in the Tirukkural. The "Kavacham" part follows the grammar of Nilai Mandila Aasiriyappaa. The plan of the song is as follows:

Invocation
Lines 1-4 Introduction: Written in Nerisai Venpa (நேரிசை வெண்பா)
Lines 5-6 Meditation: Written in Kural venba (குறள் வெண்பா)
Main Song
Lines 1-16 Author invites the Lord to the devotee
Lines 17-27 Mantras are used to invite the Lord presented to the devotee
Lines 28-32 Upon using mantras, the divine light and the presence of the Lord is felt
Lines 33-45 Author describes the way the Lord looks at the devotee
Lines 46-54 Author strings the sounds of the Lord's footsteps and anklets into mantras
Lines 55-56 Depicts the swiftness of the Lord in coming to the rescue of His devotee
Lines 57-58 Surrendering of the devotee to the Lord and the devotee's prayers unto Him
Lines 59-95 Praising the Lord, these lines concern with the protection of individual parts of the body
Lines 96-102 Concerns with the Lord's saving of His devotee in all times of the day
Lines 103-129 Concerns with eradication of vicious effects of demons and devils
Lines 130-140 Concerns with prayer to the God's Messenger to release the devotee from the vicious cycle of birth and death
Lines 141-148 Concerns with the protection from wild and venomous animals
Lines 149-157 Concerns with freedom from diseases
Lines 158-159 Prayer to maintain a cordial relationship with others
Lines 160-175 Praises the Lord by His various names and His divine deeds
Lines 176-177 Worshiping Goddess Saraswathi, the goddess of knowledge
Lines 178-186 Describes the divine power of the Sacred Ash (Vibuthi) and its effects
Lines 187-192 Praises the Lord
Lines 193-199 Seeks asylum in the Lord
Lines 200-208 Describes the procedures for reciting the song
Lines 209-214 Describes the divine effects of the song
Lines 215-219 Describes the effects of the song on evil elements
Lines 220-234 Praises the divine deeds of the Lord
Lines 235-238 Salutation and complete surrender of the self unto the Lord

The author's name is mentioned twice in the song, first in Line 64 and then in Line 201.

Grammar employed in the song
The song employs Nilaimandila aasiriyappa, one of the poetic forms in the Tamil language. The armour and meditation parts of the Introduction section employ the Venpa metre and Kural venba metre, respectively.

Nerisai Venpa (Prayer)

Kural Venpa (Protection)

Music
The Kavasam has been set in music by various musicians over the years. The most notable of them all is that sung by the duo Rajalakshmi and Jayalakshmi, popularly known as the Soolamangalam Sisters. It is sung in ragamalika (a song composed in multiple ragas), including the ragas of Abheri, Shubhapantuvarali, Kalyani, Thodi, and Madhyamavathi.

Significance
Sashti is the day that Lord Muruga defeated the demon Soorapadman. When the devas could not tolerate the evil doings of this demon, they approached the younger son of Lord Shiva and Parvati for his assistance. He fought Soorapadman for six days, at the end of which the Lord vanquished the asura. He threw his weapon at him and split Soorapadman into two halves. One half became a peacock, which he took as his Vahana. The other became a rooster and was transformed into his banner.

The devas rejoiced—they praised the Lord and prayed to him for six days. Devotees usually narrate the Kanda Sashti Kavacham during this period. Whoever fasts and prays to Lord Muruga for the six days of Kanda Sashti is believed to receive Muruga's blessings. Those who are unable to fast all day can eat once a day or twice a day during this period depending on their health, age and will.

Devotees believe that regular chanting of this song causes the predicaments of life to be resolved and that chanting the full song 36 times a day brings wealth.

In popular culture
The hymn is highly popular in the Tamil-speaking diaspora across the globe that the phrases from the hymn, its music, and others are often imitated by people from all walks of life. The titles of the Tamil movie Kaakha Kaakha and the Indian soap opera Kakka Kakka are taken from the Kanda Shasti Kavasam. The Tamil film song “Padhinettu vayadhu ilamottu manadhu” from the movie Surieyan imitates the tune of the hymn.

Controversy 
In July 2020, Karuppar Kootam, a Periyarist-Dravidian group, posted a YouTube video with an interpretation of the hymn that many Hindus around the world considered to be vulgar and offensive. Soon after the incident, following a complaint filed by the Bharatiya Janata Party Tamil Nadu with the Commissioner of Police, Greater Chennai City, the Tamil Nadu Police arrested two members of the YouTube channel.

See also
 Skanda (Buddhism)
 Skanda Purana
 Murugan
 Soolamangalam Sisters

References

External links

 Kandha sahsti kavasam reading
 Skanda sashti
  in Tamil
 

Kaumaram